Gulkevichsky District is an administrative district (raion), one of the thirty-eight in Krasnodar Krai, Russia. As a municipal division, it is incorporated as Gulkevichsky Municipal District. It is located in the east of the krai. Its administrative center is the town of Gulkevichi. Population:  The population of Gulkevichi accounts for 34.7% of the district's total population.

References

Notes

Sources

Districts of Krasnodar Krai